Tajikistan Humanitarian International University is a university in Tajikistan. It is located in Dushanbe.

References

Universities in Tajikistan
Education in Dushanbe